Glenn "Bo" Overton (born July 9, 1960) is an American basketball coach who is currently the head women's basketball coach at Oklahoma Baptist University. Prior to OBU, he was coaching in the Women's Chinese Basketball Association.

Early life and education
Born in Ada, Oklahoma, Overton was the 1979 Oklahoma High School Basketball Player of the Year as a senior at Ada High School.

Overton played at the University of Oklahoma from 1980 to 1983, and was a starting point guard. At the end of his career, he held school records for free throw percentage, assists and games played.

Professional playing career
He was selected by the Phoenix Suns in the 1983 NBA draft. He played for the Toronto Tornadoes of the Continental Basketball Association in the 1984–85 season, then was an assistant coach for that team, which by then moved to Pensacola, Florida, in the 1985–86 season.

Coaching career
He was the head coach and athletic director at Murray State College in Tishomingo, Oklahoma from 1989 to 1991. Overton was a men's basketball assistant coach at Oral Roberts (1987 to 1988 and 1991 to 1993), Texas State (1993 to 1994), and Louisiana Tech (1994 to 1998) as a men's assistant coach.

Overton returned to his alma mater to coach Oklahoma Sooners women's basketball under Sherri Coale. The Sooners played in the 2002 Final Four. After OU he was the head coach at UMKC.

On December 12, 2006, Overton resigned from UMKC to become head coach for the Chicago Sky of the WNBA. He resigned on March 12, 2008, following a 14–20 season.

Overton was a consultant to the WNBA's Tulsa Shock from 2008 to 2009. From 2009 to 2010, he was an assistant coach for the Bahamas women's national basketball team. Overton then coached for Liaoning Hengye of the Women's Chinese Basketball Association (WCBA) from 2011 to 2012. Overton then coached the China women's national basketball team during the 2012 Summer Olympics, then the Guangdong Dragons of the WCBA in the 2012–13 season and Dynamo Kursk of the Russian Women's Basketball Premier League in 2013–14.

In 2015, Overton became head women's basketball coach at Oklahoma City University. He would lead Oklahoma City to a NAIA national championship in the 2016-17 season and named coach of the year.

On March 16, 2020, Overton was named the head coach at Oklahoma Baptist University.

Head coaching record

College

WNBA

|-
| style="text-align:left;"|Chicago
| style="text-align:left;"|2007
|34||14||20|||| align="center"|6th in Eastern|||—||—||—||—
| style="text-align:center;"|—
|- class="sortbottom"
| align="center" colspan="2"|Career
|34||14||20|||| ||—||—||—||—||

References

External links
Biography at WNBA.com
Bo Overton resigned as Head Coach/General Manager

1960 births
Living people
American expatriate basketball people in Canada
American expatriate basketball people in China
American expatriate basketball people in Russia
American men's basketball players
American people of Chickasaw descent
American women's basketball coaches
Basketball coaches from Oklahoma
Basketball players from Oklahoma
Chicago Sky coaches
Junior college men's basketball coaches in the United States
Louisiana Tech Bulldogs basketball coaches
Murray State Racers athletic directors
Oklahoma City Stars women's basketball coaches
Oklahoma Sooners men's basketball players
Oklahoma Sooners women's basketball coaches
Oral Roberts Golden Eagles men's basketball coaches
Phoenix Suns draft picks
Sportspeople from Ada, Oklahoma
Texas State Bobcats men's basketball coaches
Toronto Tornados players
Women's National Basketball Association general managers
Kansas City Roos women's basketball coaches
Guards (basketball)
20th-century Native Americans
21st-century Native Americans